Bois-Seigneur-Isaac Castle is a stately home in Ophain-Bois-Seigneur-Isaac, Wallonia, part of the commune of Braine-l'Alleud, Walloon Brabant, Belgium. The present building dates from 1737, but the site is substantially older.

Associated with the House of Snoy, the château's notable residents include the diplomat Jean-Charles Snoy et d'Oppuers (1907–91),

See also
List of castles in Belgium

Sources
 BelgianCastles.be: Bois-Seigneur-Isaac

Castles in Belgium
Castles in Walloon Brabant
Braine-l'Alleud